John Allan Clinton Hattie  (born 1950) is a New Zealand education academic. He has been a professor of education and director of the Melbourne Education Research Institute at the University of Melbourne, Australia, since March 2011. He was previously professor of education at the University of Auckland, the University of North Carolina Greensboro, and the University of Western Australia. In addition to being lauded as a leading educational expert, previously John Hattie taught both middle school and high school as a classroom teacher before entering graduate studies.

Early life
Hattie was born in 1950 in Timaru, and attended Timaru Boys' High School.

Academic career
John Hattie received his PhD degree in statistics from at the University of Toronto in 1981 on detecting unidimensionality. His research focuses on performance indicators and evaluation in education, as well as creativity measurement and models of teaching and learning. He is a proponent of evidence based quantitative research methodologies on the influences on student achievement. He led the team that created the Assessment Tools for Teaching and Learning research and development contract and which is currently deployed by the New Zealand Ministry of Education for use in schools.  Prior to his move to the University of Melbourne, Hattie was a member of the independent advisory group reporting to the New Zealand's Minister of Education on the national standards in reading, writing and maths for all primary school children in New Zealand.

Hattie undertook the largest ever synthesis of meta-analyses of quantitative measures of the effect of different factors on educational outcomes leading to his book Visible Learning.

Hattie advised the Fifth National Government of New Zealand on national learning standards and performance-related pay for teachers.

Visible Learning has come under criticism for mathematical flaws in the calculation of effect sizes and misleading presentation of meta-analyses in the book.

In the 2011 Queen's Birthday Honours, Hattie was appointed an Officer of the New Zealand Order of Merit, for services to education.

He is married to Professor Janet Clinton, also at the University of Melbourne.

References

Bibliography

External links 
 Archive of Bio page at Auckland University
 Bio page at University of Melbourne

1950 births 
Living people
Officers of the New Zealand Order of Merit
Academic staff of the University of Auckland
University of Otago alumni
People from Timaru
Academic staff of the University of Melbourne
University of North Carolina faculty
Academic staff of the University of Western Australia